Jalava is a Finnish surname. Notable people with the surname include:

 Oskari Jalava (1876–1950), Finnish plater and politician
 Pertti Jalava (born 1960), Finnish composer
 Petri Jalava (born 1976), Finnish footballer
 Reijo Jalava
 Randy T. Jalava (Born 1965), Canadian independent music artist

Finnish-language surnames